Decaisnina brittenii is a species of flowering plant, an epiphytic hemiparasitic plant of the family Loranthaceae native to the Northern Territory, Queensland and northern Western Australia.

D. brittenii has linear to narrowly lanceolate leaves and this is the only way in which it differs from D. signata.
It is typically found on Melaleuca & Barringtonia.

Taxonomy
Decaisnina brittenii was first described in 1922 as Loranthus brittenii by William Blakely, despite a specimen, NSW 79295, having been collected by Joseph Banks at Endeavour River in 1770 during Cook's first voyage, and subsequently drawn for Joseph Banks by Daniel Solander.  In 1966, Bryan Alwyn Barlow reassigned it to the genus, Decaisnina.

Etymology
The generic name, Decaisnina honours the French botanist, Joseph Decaisne (1807–1882), and the specific epithet, brittenii, honours the British botanist, James Britten (1846–1924),

References

External links 
 Decaisnina brittenii Occurrence data from the Australasian Virtual Herbarium

brittenii
Flora of Western Australia
Flora of the Northern Territory
Flora of Queensland
Parasitic plants
Epiphytes
Taxa named by William Blakely